Caroline Dexter (6 January 1819 – 19 August 1884) was an English-Australian dress reformer, writer, and feminist.

Biography
Dexter was born in Nottingham, England; she was educated privately in England and Paris. In 1843, she married the painter, William Dexter, he migrated to Australia aboard the Bank of England arriving in Sydney in 1852, and she arrived in the Marie Gabrielle in 1855. In Sydney, they opened and ran a Gallery of Arts and School of Design.

They moved on to Gippsland in 1856. While in Gippsland Caroline wrote her Ladies Almanack: The Southern Cross or Australian Album and New Years Gift. When it was published in 1858 it was 'The First Ladies' Almanack Published in the Colonies'. Soon after the book was complete the Dexters separated and Caroline moved to Melbourne.

After lecturing about the bloomers in London and beyond, Caroline continued to pursue her interest in dress reform in Australia. Her continued support for dress reform caused controversy in the Sydney Morning Herald. Nonetheless, she ran an Institute of Hygiene and promoted divided skirts for women and the abolition of corsets in Melbourne. She also met Harriet Clisby and together they produced the first all-women publication  in 1861. The Interpreter ran for two issues. In 1861, Caroline married William Lynch, together they held a salon and acquired an important collection of Australian art.

Legacy
Dexter Street in the Canberra suburb Cook is named in her honour. A book about William and Caroline, Folie A Deux: William and Caroline Dexter in Colonial Australia, was written by Patrick Morgan in 1999.

References

1819 births
1884 deaths
Australian feminist writers
Australian women journalists
English emigrants to Australia
19th-century Australian journalists
19th-century Australian writers
19th-century Australian women writers
19th-century British women writers
19th-century British writers
Salon-holders